Ordnance may refer to:

Military and defense
Materiel in military logistics, including weapons, ammunition, vehicles, and maintenance tools and equipment
Artillery
Artillery shells
Aircraft ordnance, weapons carried by and used by an aircraft

Places
Ordnance, Oregon, United States
Ordnance Island, Bermuda

Maps-related
Ordnance datum (from use in ballistics), a vertical datum used as the basis for deriving altitudes on maps
Ordnance Survey, the national mapping agency for Great Britain

See also
Ordnance Corps (disambiguation)